Westland Whirlwind may mean:

 Westland Whirlwind (fighter), a fixed wing Second World War fighter aircraft
 Westland Whirlwind (helicopter), a post-war helicopter based on the Sikorsky S-55